MedTalk HealthTalk is a public affairs show produced by Nine Media Corporation which has been broadcast by CNN Philippines (formerly 9TV) since 2012 which talks about medical topics. It is hosted by Dr. Freddie Gomez. On March 15, 2018, MedTalk renamed as MedTalk Health Talk.

Hosts
Main host
Dr. Freddie Gomez (2016–2017; 2018–present)

Former host
Angel Jacob (2012-2016)

See also
Solar Entertainment Corporation
Solar TV Network
Talk TV (the former name of Solar News Channel)
Solar News and Current Affairs
Solar Daybreak
Solar Newsday
Solar Network News
Solar Nightly News
Solar Headlines

References

Philippine television shows
CNN Philippines original programming
CNN Philippines News and Current Affairs
English-language television shows
2012 Philippine television series debuts
Television productions suspended due to the COVID-19 pandemic